Argentière is a picturesque skiing, alpine walking and mountaineering village in the French Alps, part of the commune of Chamonix-Mont-Blanc, at an altitude of .

Geography
It is connected by road with Switzerland by the pass over the Col des Montets and the Col de la Forclaz to Martigny in the Rhône Valley. The village also lies on the route of the scenic Mont-Blanc Express railway which runs from Saint-Gervais-les-Bains-Le Fayet station through Chamonix, Argentière and Vallorcine before crossing the France–Switzerland border at Le Châtelard, passing through Finhaut before reaching the end of the line in Martigny.

The Argentière Glacier, which lies to the southeast of the village, is bound on its northeast side by the Aiguille du Chardonnet, the Aiguille d'Argentière and the Tour Noir, as well as on its southwest by the Aiguille Verte, Les Droites and Les Courtes. This area is generally known as the Argentière basin.

Winter sports
Argentiere is a popular destination for skiing, snowboarding and snowshoeing, attracting many skiers and snowboarders in the winter season – typically mid-December to early May – and is an ideal location for those who seek an exceptional alpine sports experience. The village is an equally popular location in summer season – June to September – for alpine walkers, rock and ice climbers, and as a base for many other alpine sports activities.

Argentière is the starting point for the Téléphérique du Lognan cable car up to Les Grands Montets, a skiing area famous for its steep and demanding slopes, both on-piste as well as off-piste. In total, the skiing area is served by a cable car (in two sections), a gondola, five chairlifts and some skilifts. Along with the Vallée Blanche, Les Grands Montets draws skiers from all around the world to the Chamonix Valley each and every year.

Because of its central location three other ski areas, the Valle Blanche, Domaine de Balme[Le Tour/Vallorcine] and Brevent/Flegere are a short journey from Argentiere by Chamonix Bus or the Mont Blanc Express local train.

See also
 Aaron ben Perez of Avignon
 Haute Route
 Tour du Mont Blanc
 Saint-Gervais–Vallorcine railway
 Argentière station
 Argentière Hut

References

External links 

 Walking trails starting from Argentière
 Site of french glaciologist Luc Moreau

Haute-Savoie
Villages in Auvergne-Rhône-Alpes
Ski resorts in France